Amund Høie Sjursen (born 16 January 1996) is a Norwegian professional athlete who competes in long jump and sprinting. Sjursen has won the honours of National champion and National Indoor champion twice.

References

1996 births
Living people
Norwegian long jumpers
Norwegian sprinters